Hookersville is an unincorporated community in Nicholas County, West Virginia, United States.

A post office called Hookersville was established in 1856, and remained in operation until it was discontinued in 1962.

References

Unincorporated communities in Nicholas County, West Virginia
Unincorporated communities in West Virginia